was a district located in Shimane Prefecture, Japan.

As of 2003, the district had an estimated population of 8,682 and a density of 83.93 persons per km2. The total area was 103.44 km2.

Former towns and villages
 Nima
 Yunotsu

Merger
On October 1, 2005 - the towns of Nima and Yunotsu was merged into the expanded city of Ōda. Nima District was dissolved as a result of this merger.

Former districts of Shimane Prefecture